Shanon Hays (born February 12, 1968) is an American softball coach for the Grand Canyon Antelopes. Previously, he was the head coach at Texas Tech and remains the winningest coach in program history. He also has held several positions as a men's basketball coach and an athletic director.

Early years 
Hays played college baseball and basketball at Lubbock Christian University where he lettered in both sports in 1987. He transferred to Texas Tech where he played under his father Larry Hays.

Coaching career 
Hays began his coaching career as a graduate assistant at Texas Tech in 1991-92. He then held a pair of high school head coaching positions, first at Sundown High School in 1992-93 for boys basketball, then at Lubbock Christian High School in 1993-94 and 1994–95, leading both the baseball and boys basketball programs. At Lubbock Christian, he went 50-15 as the basketball coach and led the program to the private school state championship game. He led the baseball program to two state tournament appearances and played in the state championship game in his second season.

Basketball 
Hays spent one season as the head coach at Frank Phillips College in the 1995-96 season. He inherited a 4-25 team and went 19-10 in his one season, earning Western Junior College Athletic Conference Coach of the Year honors.

Hays took the reins of the Abilene Christian Wildcats men's basketball program in 1996-97 and led the Wildcats for three seasons. He went 58-26 leading the program. Chris Beard was an assistant on his staff in his first season at Abilene Christian.

He left Abilene Christian in 1999 to join James Dickey's Texas Tech coaching staff for two seasons. He was not retained when Texas Tech hired Bob Knight in 2001.

After briefly leaving the coaching world for a career in pharmaceutical sales and then an athletic director post, Hays took over as the head coach of Midland College on April 16, 2003. He went 27-7 in his one season.

Hays returned to the Division I ranks as an assistant coach at Houston, hired by Tom Penders. He spent two seasons with the program in what would be his last position in men's basketball.

Softball 
Hays' first opportunity in the softball coaching ranks came in 2006 where he started the softball program at Lubbock Christian University. He was named the head coach on October 24, 2006. In the program's inaugural season in 2008, they went 58-9-2 and claimed an NAIA National Championship.

Texas Tech named Hays its seventh softball head coach on June 8, 2009. He guided the Red Raiders for five seasons and remains the school's winningest coach. He resigned on May 13, 2014.

Hays took over as the head coach at Colorado Christian University on December 1, 2016, and spent three years leading the program.

He was named the head coach at Oklahoma Christian University in 2018 and guided the Eagles for three seasons.

Hays was named the head coach at Grand Canyon on June 11, 2021. He wasted no time reviving the Lopes program, posting a 39-16 overall record, winning the WAC's regular-season and tournament championships, and leading the program to its first appearance in the NCAA Division I softball tournament.

Athletic administration 
At age 34, Hays became the athletic director at Abilene Christian University on June 1, 2002. After less than a year in the post, he resigned, citing that "coaching is in my blood, and it's been hard to be away from it."

Softball head coaching record 
The following table lists Hays' softball head coaching record at the NCAA level.

References

External links 

 Grand Canyon profile

1968 births
Living people
American softball coaches
Texas Tech Red Raiders baseball players
Texas Tech Red Raiders softball coaches